Mazzè is a comune (municipality) in the Province of Turin in the Italian region Piedmont, located about  northeast of Turin.

Mazzè borders the following municipalities: Vische, Candia Canavese, Moncrivello, Caluso, Cigliano, Villareggia, Rondissone, and Chivasso.

References

Cities and towns in Piedmont
Canavese